Michelle Helen Lombardo (born September 16, 1983) is an American model and actress. Lombardo gained fame with her appearances in the 2000s Sports Illustrated Swimsuit Issues. She made her film debut in Dishdogz in 2005 and began acting on television in 2007 on Entourage. She had a major role as Tyler Murphy in Girltrash! and appeared in the box-office hit Click (2006). She had small roles in the comedy action film Cat Run (2011) and drama film Redwood Highway (2013), and appeared in television series The Defenders, Mad Men and Girlfriends' Guide to Divorce.

Early life
Michelle Helen Lombardo was born on September 16, 1983 in Glastonbury, Connecticut. Lombardo has one brother and one sister. Lombardo was the captain of her volleyball team at Glastonbury High School.  In 1999, she was discovered at her high school career day by model scout Tina Kiniry from John Casablancas Modeling & Acting Agency. Early in her career, she worked locally in Connecticut as a model. In 2001 and 2002, she attended University of Connecticut, taking courses in nutrition. She relocated to Los Angeles to pursue her dream of becoming a model and an actress.

Career 
In 2004, she won the inaugural Sports Illustrated "Fresh Face" contest and appeared in the magazine's annual Swimsuit Issue in 2004 and 2005. Lombardo and eight other "Fresh Face" contestants appeared together on The Late Late Show with Craig Kilborn, taking part in a skit with Danny DeVito. In February 2004, Lombardo learned that she was the winner of the contest in a segment on Dateline NBC and signed a three-year contract with Next Model Management. She has been the cover of Triathlete and in pictorials for Playboy and Complex. She appeared in commercials for Suzuki Forenza and T-Mobile. Lombardo was ranked at number 53 on AskMen's list of the Top 99 Most Desirable Women of 2008.

She has had guest roles on Entourage, October Road, Mad Men and The Defenders. She had roles films Click (2006), All In (2006), Stiletto (2008), Calvin Marshall (2009), Cat Run (2011) and Girltrash: All Night Long (2014). She portrayed Surfer Girl, one of Hank Moody's love interests, on the first season of Californication. In 2008, she had a recurring role as Debra on web series Quarterlife. She played the main role of Tyler Murphy on the web series Girltrash!. She was also a host on the cable network Current TV.

Personal life 
In her spare time, Lombardo enjoys outdoor activities such as mountain biking, reading, snowboarding and swimming. She has three children.

Filmography

References 

1983 births
American female models
American film actresses
Living people
People from Glastonbury, Connecticut
Current TV people
Actresses from Connecticut
21st-century American actresses